The NASA Exceptional Scientific Achievement Medal (abbreviated ESAM) was established by NASA on September 15, 1961, when the original ESM was divided into three separate awards. Under the current guidelines, the ESAM is awarded for unusually significant scientific contribution toward achievement of aeronautical or space exploration goals. This award may be given for individual efforts that have resulted in a contribution of fundamental importance in this field, or have significantly enhanced understanding of this field.

Recipients (incomplete list) 
 1962 – Robert E. Bourdeau
 1963 – John Houbolt
 1965 – Jack N. James
 1966 – Richard Franz Joseph Arenstorf (He was awarded the medal for his contributions to the Space Navigation and the Apollo Lunar Landing Program.
 1968 – G. Mervin Ault
 1969 – Charles Berry, William F. Brown, Thomas Canning, Moustafa Chahine, Hong-Yee Chiu, Clarence Cone, James Downey, Erwin Fehlberg, Richard Green, Rudolf Hanel, Webb Haymaker, Gerhard B. Heller, Harvey Hubbard, James Humphreys, Mark Kelly, James Kupperian, Dale Lumb, Wolfgang Moeckel, Paul Muller, Robert Naumann, William O'Bryant, George Pieper, Henry Plotkin, Joseph Randall, Donald Rea, Nancy Roman, Lee Scherer, William Sjorgen, Charles Sonett, Robert Stone, David Wark, Richard Whitcomb, Donald Wise
 1970 – William Angele, James R. Arnold, Paul Coleman, Leverett Davis, Milner Eskew, Herbert Friedman, Paul Gast, Peter Macdoran, Warren Martin, Maurice Morin, Marcia Neugebauer, Edward Perkins, Edward Smith, Conway Snyder, Nelson Spencer, Patrick Thaddeus, Robert Walker, Gerald Wasserburg
 1971 – John C. Freche
 1972 – Robert Steinbacher, Thomas C. Duxbury, Charles H. Acton
 1973 – William A. Fischer, Founder & Sr. Scientist, EROS Space Program; Recipient of the US Distinguished Service Award & many others. [Conway B. Leovy]
 1974 – John A. Simpson, William Edgar Thornton August F. Witt, Carolyn L. Huntoon
 1975 – Edward Purdy Ney
 1976 – Tito T. Serafini
 1977 – Janos K. Lanyi
 1978 – Elihu Boldt, Hale Bradt, Herbert Friedman, Gordon Garmire, Herbert Gursky, Walter Lewin, Frank McDonald, Laurence Peterson, Alvin Seiff, Robert Tolson
 1979 – Milton Halem
 1980 – Riccardo Giacconi (2002 Nobel Laureate in Physics)
 1981 – Andrew Ingersoll, Talivaldis Spalvins
 1982 – Mary Helen Johnston, Jeff Cuzzi, James V. Taranik
 1983 – Joel S. Levine
 1984 – Donald B. Campbell, Fred Gillett, James R. Houck, Frank Low
 1985 – Prem Chand Pandey, SAC/ISRO, NCAOR and IIT Kharagpur, India, Parviz Moin
 1986 – Jeff Cuzzi, Crofton B. Farmer, Frank J. Grunthaner, Taylor G. Wang
 1988 – Nitza Margarita Cintrón, Hal A. Weaver, Michael J. Mumma
 1989 – Mario Molina (1995 Nobel Laureate in Chemistry), Donald J. Kessler, Inez Fung
 1990 – Charles M. Telesco, John W. Harvey, Martin A. Pomerantz
 1991 – Khairul B. M. Q. Zaman, John C. Mather (2006 Nobel Laureate in Physics), Manuel D. Salas, Roy W. Spencer, John Christy
 1992 – Charles L. Bennett, John C.Brandt, Edward S. Cheng, Donald D. Clayton, Holland C. Ford, Edward J. Groth, Richard J. Harms, Sara E. Heap, Peter Jakobson, William H. Jefferys, Thomas Kelsall, Michael D. King, Tod R. Lauer, David S. Leckrone, F. Duccio Macchetto, Stephan S. Meyers, S. Harvey Moseley, Thomas L. Murdock, Michael J. Prather, Richard A. Shafer, Robert F. Silverberg, Wei-kuo Tao, James A. Westphal, Ray J. Weymann, Edward L. Wright, James A. DiCarlo, Nathan S. Jacobson, George Smoot (2006 Nobel Laureate in Physics)
 1993 – Rebecca A. MacKay
 1994 – Robert A. Bindschadler, Theodore E. Bunch, Emmett W. Chappelle, Malcolm M. Cohen, Dale P. Cruikshank, Hay C. Hardin, Alice K. Harding, Donald Horan, Winifred M. Huo, Isabella T. Lewis, Erick Malaret, Camden McCarl, Robert Riesse, Piers J. Sellers, Trevor C. Sorensen, Thomas A. Zang Jr.
 1995 – James L. Smialek, Maria T. Zuber, Robert D. Moser
 1996 – Kevin Zahnle, Carolyn Shoemaker, Eugene Merle Shoemaker
 1997 – James O. Arnold, David H. Atkinson, David H. Bailey, John E. Carlstrom, Ara Chutjian, John W. Connell, Harald M. Fischer, Everett K. Gibson Jr., William L. Grose, Marshall K. Joy, Kathie L. Thomas-Keprta, Louis J. Lanzerotti, David S. McKay, Michael J. Mumma, Hasso B. Niemann, Glenn S. Orton, Peter A. Pilewskie, Carolyn Purvis, Boris Ragent, Alvin Seiff, Lawrence Sromovsky, Ulf von Zahn, Richard N. Zare
 1998 – Narottam P. Bansal, Timothy J. Lee
 1999 – Jeff Cuzzi, Martin Weisskopf
 2000 – Hugh J. Christian Jr., Joan Feynman, Mona J. Hagyard, Yoram J. Kaufman, Ellis E. Remsberg
 2002 – Thomas P. Charlock, Gilles Peltzer
 2003 – Philip R. Christensen, Jean O. Dickey, Geoffrey W. Marcy, Martin G. Mlynczak, Ronald L. Moore, Richard F. Mushotzky, Eric Rignot, Farid Salama, Wei-Kuo Tao
 2004 – Charles L. Bennett, Randall G. Hulet, David P. Kratz, Steven J. Ostro, Thomas L. Sever, Chris R. Webster, Yuk-ling Yung
 2005 – Ichiro Fukumori, James R. Houck, Nicholas Leventis, Steven Suess, Michael Watkins
 2006 – Michael F. A’Hearn, David Charbonneau, Drake Deming, Neil Gehrels, John Le Marshall, Edward C. Stone, Tod Strohmayer, Larry W. Thomason
 2007 – Scott Braun, Donald Brownlee, Joan Centrella, Moustafa Chahine, Mark S. Marley, Eric Rignot, Alan Title
 2008 – Anthony Del Genio, David G. Fischer, Gerald M. Heymsfield, Russell A. Howard, Ronald Kwok, Michael I. Mishchenko, Son V. Nghiem
 2009 – James E. Fesmire, Gilles Peltzer, Michael J. Mumma, Anne R. Douglass
 2010 – Peter H. Smith, William V. Boynton, Heather L. Enos, Christopher R. Shinohara 
 2011 – Carl J. Grillmair, Suzanne E. Smrekar, Yuhe T. Song, Timothy J. Lee, Eric Jensen, Jason Rowe, Jeff Scargle, Cheryl A. Nickerson
 2013 – David Paige
 2014 – Joshua Coleman, Daniel Huber
 2015 – Carrie M. Anderson
 2016 – David R. Ciardi, Amy R. Winebarger, Francesco Tombesi, Hiroya Yamaguchi 
 2017 – Sylvain Guiriec, Maria Cristina De Sanctis, Samuel Gulkis, Thomas H. Prettyman, Michele Vallisneri, Kasthuri J. Venkateswaran
 2018 – Susan E. Mullally, Michael B. Stenger, Adolfo Figueroa Vinas, Gordon Holman, Lazaros Oreopoulos, Richard Ray, M. Cristina De Sanctis, Walter A. Petersen, Michael Russell
 2019 – John D. Bolten, Carl R. Devore, Alex Glocer, Jonathan H. Jiang, Erin A. Kara, Fei Liu, Elizabeth A. MacDonald, Amy A. Simon, Lynn B. Wilson III, Cheol Park 
 2020 – Renee C. Weber, Zaven Arzoumanian
 2021 – John Baross, Eli Dwek, Floyd William Stecker, Eleonora Troja
 2022 – Sibasish Laha, Jane Rigby, Michael McElwain, Zivi Lautman,

See also
 List of NASA awards

References

External links
 List of NASA Honor Awards
 Materials Division – NASA Exceptional Scientific Achievement Medals

Awards and decorations of NASA
Awards established in 1961